Moose Factory Island is an island in the Moose River, Ontario, Canada, about  from its mouth at James Bay. It is adjacent to the community of Moosonee across the Moose River, from which it is accessible by water taxi. The island is home to the community of Moose Factory. This town is associated with the entire island, but politically, the island is divided into two entities:
 Factory Island 1 - Indian reserve that makes up the northern two-thirds of the island, belonging to the Moose Cree First Nation (population: 1451).
 Unorganized North Cochrane District - Unincorporated southern third, home to the historic Hudson's Bay Company post and government services, governed by the provincial Local Services Board and the federal Weeneebayko Health Ahtuskaywin that administers the hospital (population: 1007).

Moose Factory Island is part of the poorly drained, sparsely forested Hudson Bay Lowlands. It is flat and made up of marine clay, underlain by sedimentary rocks, mainly limestone, dolomite and shale.

References 

River islands of Ontario